Colony is a town in Cullman County, Alabama, United States. At the 2010 census the population was 268, down from 385 in 2000. Colony is a historically African-American town. In its early days it was a haven for African Americans in the Deep South. It incorporated in 1981.

Geography
The town is located along Alabama State Route 91, approximately one mile west of Interstate 65.

History
Colony most likely was originally established soon after the emancipation of slaves after the Civil War, during Reconstruction. It is believed that the original settlers of the town were most likely freed slaves from Baltimore, Alabama. It is the only African American community in Cullman County, which was founded in 1873, and was considered a safe haven for Blacks at a time when other cities with white majorities were considered dangerous for Blacks, and referred to as 'sundown' cities because after sundown Blacks were in danger there. Those that originally settled there were given land as compensation for being slaves, with over 8,000 acres eventually cultivated as farm land.

In the early days of Colony it was not considered part of Cullman County because the freed Blacks were not welcome. But when coal mines began to open adjacent to Colony the leaders of Cullman County wanted to incorporate the coal mines into the county for economic reasons, and were forced to add Colony as well. Colony was incorporated as a town in 1981 during the tenure of Mayor Earlene Johnson. The town celebrates Colony Day annually in August.

Demographics

2020 census

As of the 2020 United States census, there were 264 people, 188 households, and 123 families residing in the town.

2000 census
As of the census of 2000, there were 385 people, 130 households, and 99 families residing in the town. The racial makeup of the town was 5.71% White, 93.51% Black or African American, 0.26% Native American, 0.26% from other races, and 0.26% from two or more races. 0.78% of the population were Hispanic or Latino of any race.

There were 130 households, out of which 27.7% had children under the age of 18 living with them, 46.9% were married couples living together, 23.1% had a female householder with no husband present, and 23.8% were non-families. 20.8% of all households were made up of individuals, and 6.2% had someone living alone who was 65 years of age or older. The average household size was 2.92 and the average family size was 3.41.

In the town, the population was spread out, with 26.0% under the age of 18, 10.6% from 18 to 24, 27.3% from 25 to 44, 24.7% from 45 to 64, and 11.4% who were 65 years of age or older. The median age was 35 years. For every 100 females, there were 103.7 males. For every 100 females age 18 and over, there were 100.7 males.

The median income for a household in the town was $32,708, and the median income for a family was $35,417. Males had a median income of $24,821 versus $19,125 for females. The per capita income for the town was $12,415. About 12.0% of families and 12.7% of the population were below the poverty line, including 8.5% of those under age 18 and 41.3% of those age 65 or over.

Notable person
 James C. Fields, member of the Alabama House of Representatives from 2008 to 2010

References 

Towns in Cullman County, Alabama
Towns in Alabama
Populated places established in 1981